Notable atheists with surnames starting C and D, sortable by the field for which they are mainly known and nationality.

Notes

References

surnames C to D